The following elections occurred in the year 1809.

North America

United States
 1808 and 1809 United States House of Representatives elections
 1809 Pennsylvania's 1st congressional district special election
 1809 United States House of Representatives elections in Tennessee
 1809 United States House of Representatives elections in Virginia
 1808 and 1809 United States Senate elections
 1809 United States Senate election in New York

See also
 :Category:1809 elections

1809
 
Elections